Auch ich war nur ein mittelmäßiger Schüler is a 1974 West German comedy film directed by Werner Jacobs and starring Detlev Eckstein, Bernd Herberger and Jutta Speidel. Two men waiting for their wives to give birth, reminisce about their school days.

Cast
 Detlev Eckstein as Peter 'Pitt' Ahrens
 Bernd Herberger as Felix Kempmann
 Jutta Speidel as Julia
 Christiane Krüger as Fräulein Steiner
 Kristina Nel as Astrid
 Horst Tappert as Dr. Siegfried Elsenbeck
 Georg Thomalla as Prof. Dr. Fabian
 Rudolf Platte as Mr. Dengel
 Gerlinde Locker as Frau Ahrens
 Claus Biederstaedt as Wolfgang Ahrens
 Konrad Georg as Krüger
 Margot Trooger as Fräulein Landgraf
 Günter Mack as Dr. Krummbach
 Wolfgang Spier as Wiesling
 Walter Gross as Oskar Kunzfeld
 Harald Juhnke as Arzt
 Inge Marschall as Krankenschwester

External links

1974 films
1974 comedy films
West German films
German comedy films
1970s German-language films
Films directed by Werner Jacobs
Films based on German novels
Films set in schools
1970s German films